Red Nose Day 2011 was a fundraising event organised by Comic Relief. There was a live telethon broadcast on BBC One and BBC Two from the evening of 18 March 2011 to early the following morning as well as a number of run-up events. The theme for the Red Nose Day 2011 invited fund-raisers to "Do Something Funny For Money".

Results
Donations to Comic Relief's Red Nose Day 2011 reached £74,360,207, the largest total reached on the night in the event's 23-year history. Comic Relief co-founder Richard Curtis said: "This is more than we ever believed we would raise. The generosity of the British public is staggering."

BT handled 765,777 calls to the donation line during the live TV show. These reached a peak of 268 calls per second (16,080 calls per minute) at 21.50pm. BT coordinated around 10,000 volunteers at 129 call centres across the UK.

The sum for the 13th Red Nose Day includes:
 £10,030,984 raised so far by Sainsbury's, itself the biggest single donation ever received on the night of Red Nose Day.
 £1,375,037 raised by the nine Red Nose Desert Trekkers (Ronni Ancona, Craig David, Lorraine Kelly, Scott Mills, Olly Murs, Dermot O'Leary, Nadia Sawalha, Kara Tointon and Peter White) who all completed a 108 kilometre trek across the Kaisut Desert in northern Kenya.
 £3,165,705 raised by Radio 1: £543,284 of this was raised in support of Scott Mills and the Desert Trekkers; and the remaining £2,622,421 was raised by Chris Moyles and Comedy Dave Vitty in their record breaking 52-hour marathon radio broadcast.
The Government's Department for International Development (DFID) will match Comic Relief's commitment to spend £10 million improving health and education across Africa.

Red Nose Day typically raises many millions more than the amount raised on the night. Further donations will continue to be received, and the films shown will start to generate income themselves as many of the sketches are available for purchase and download from iTunes.

Before main event

Documentaries

The BT Red Nose Desert Trek
It was broadcast on 17 March 2011. During the Red Nose Day evening, it was announced that £1,375,037 was raised by completing the trek.

Comic Relief: Girl On Wire
She became the first ever British woman to walk a tightrope this high. During the Red Nose Day evening, it was announced Helen's traverse raised £253,789 for Comic Relief.

Famous, Rich and in the Slums
Famous, Rich and in the Slums, a two-part documentary for Red Nose Day followed Lenny Henry, Samantha Womack, Angela Rippon and Reggie Yates as they were left alone for a week to live, work and survive in one of the most impoverished places on earth – the slums of Kibera, Kenya.

Television and radio

24 Hour Panel People
From midday to midday on 5–6 March, a marathon panel show, titled 24 Hour Panel People, was broadcast live over the official website. The event took in a succession of popular programmes, with David Walliams a constant presence for the whole 24 hours, taking on various roles. The full list of panel shows are listed below:

Room 101, with Nick Hancock returning as host after 14 years, was originally supposed to have come between They Think It's All Over and Call My Bluff, but was axed after the show ran behind. Paul Merton was advertised to reprise his role as regular team captain on Have I Got News For You but due to illness was replaced by Clive Anderson. Jason Manford was advertised to host Have I Got News For You, but for unknown reasons did not appear at all and was replaced by Patrick Kielty.

On Friday 25 March 2011 a one-hour-long highlight's show of the marathon was broadcast on BBC One. The highlights show included clips of selected games: Would I Lie to You, Just a Minute, The Generation Game, Through the Keyhole, Blankety Blank, QI, Whose Line Is It Anyway? and Never Mind the Buzzcocks, some backstage film, and two of the Comic Relief appeal films – Ruth Jones on senile dementia home respite, and David Tennant in a Ugandan hospital.

BBC Radio 1's Longest Show Ever with Chris Moyles and Comedy Dave for Comic Relief
 On 16 March 2011 at 6:30am GMT, Chris Moyles and Comedy Dave began their challenge – BBC Radio 1's Longest Show Ever with Chris Moyles and Comedy Dave for Comic Relief. Originally the challenge was to attempt to broadcast for more than 37 hours to break the record for the longest show in BBC Radio 1's history, set by Simon Mayo in 1999. On the day of the challenge starting, the team announced they would attempt to set a brand new Guinness World Record for 'Radio DJ Endurance Marathon (Team)' – aiming to broadcast for 52 hours. At 19:30 GMT on 17 March 2011 (37 hours into the challenge), the BBC Radio 1 record was beaten and had raised £1,009,033 until that point. The world record was beaten at 08:30 on 18 March 2011. A total of £2,406,648 was announced at 10:19 (raising almost £1.1m over the previous two hours).

Just prior to the final total, Fearne Cotton promised to spend the last twenty minutes of the 52-hour marathon in a swimsuit if the final total was £2,000,000 or more. As this goal had been reached, Fearne wore a black and white striped swimming costume. The number of users trying to view the studio webcam caused the Radio 1 website to crash. The station's Twitter feed jokingly acknowledged the issue, and reminded listeners that the Red Button feed was still running. In the evening on 18 March 2011, the total amount raised by Chris and Dave was £2,622,421. With a final total of £2,821,831.

On 23 March 2011, it was confirmed that an average of 2.84 million people watched the broadcast via the Red Button Interactive Service for an average of 144 minutes each.

On 18 November 2011, their record was broken by a breakfast show on the German station 98.8 KISS FM Berlin, when presenters Nora Neise and Tolga Akar were on air for 73 hours.

Schedule

Comic Relief does Glee Club
On 14 March on BBC One, CBBC created a show for the charity called Comic Relief does Glee Club which lets a group perform music in three varieties (choir, musical theatre and contemporary). The Grand Final and Comic Relief does Glee Club 2011 trophy was won by top choir Soul Mates, fifteen children from south-east and east London who go to Step Up Music Theatre School.

Let's Dance for Comic Relief

A series of Let's Dance for Comic Relief was broadcast between 19 February and 12 March. It was won by Charlie Baker and James Thornton.

Other celebrity support
Lord Prescott read the Shipping Forecast on BBC Radio 4 to raise money for Comic Relief on Saturday 19 March 2011 at approximately 0:48.
Comic duo Ant & Dec's Big Red Nose Broadcast aired on 14 March 2011. They appeared on various television shows and radio broadcasts to raise money for this year's appeal, and took items to be auctioned off for charity.

British Industry

Walkers crisps
Snack food manufacturer, Walkers created four new crisps flavours for Comic Relief 2011. Each flavour is named after a British comedian; Frank Skinner's Roast Dinner, Jimmy Con Carrne, Steak and Al Pie and Stephen Fry Up.

British Airways
British Airways set a new Guinness World Record for hosting the 'highest stand up comedy gig in the world' with Dara Ó Briain, Jack Whitehall and Jon Richardson for Red Nose Day. The airline raised £800,747 for Comic Relief through its charity partnership 'Flying Start'.

Music
The Wanted released the official comic relief 2011 single "Gold Forever" on 13 March. Other Comic Relief singles include George Michael's cover of the 1987 song "True Faith" by New Order and the Take That song "Happy Now" featuring Take That and Fake That consisting of David Walliams, James Corden, John Bishop, Alan Carr and Catherine Tate. Also Geraldine McQueen & Susan Boyle "I Know Him So Well"; the song has been expanded to overseas sales which will likely increase the output to Comic Relief.

Celebrity auctions
More than a hundred celebrities were involved in "Twit Relief", an event on Twitter.

Other events

Sack racing

On 9 March 2011, the London Shoreditch crowd wore sacks as they took part in the world's first night-time, over-18s sack racing event at Village Underground. Sponsored by drinks brand, Cafédirect, it also featured live music, comedy and DJs. Music was provided by Dog is Dead, CockNBullKid and Roll Deep. Pre- and post-race DJ sets came from T4's Jameela Jamil, Gavin and Stacey star Mat Horne, BBC 1Xtra DJ Gemma Cairney, Professor Green's tour DJ DJ IQ, back to back with his lead vocalist Tom Jules and Greg Leigh. The sack race contenders included a host of famous faces, overseen by former The Apprentice contender, James McQuillan. There was also a retro raffle, and photo booth. The cost was £5 with all profits going to Comic Relief.

Main event

Impact of international events on Red Nose Day 2011
At the beginning of the show Claudia Winkleman and Michael McIntyre mentioned that although Comic Relief were not currently aiding victims of the 2011 Tōhoku earthquake and tsunami, they were monitoring the situation. Davina McCall and Graham Norton revealed in their section of the show that due to the current events, the previously scheduled 10.30pm BBC News would air in its normal slot of 10.00pm and that as planned the show would continue on BBC Two between 10.00pm and 10.35pm, unlike the previously scheduled 10.30pm – 11.05pm slot.

Presenters

Times approximate:

Appeal Film Presenters
Lenny Henry, Jack Dee, David Tennant, Steve Jones, Russell Brand and Ruth Jones all presented appeal films. Davina McCall and Lenny Henry also provided voiceovers for most of the films.

Thank Yous
Tom Fletcher & Danny Jones, Reggie Yates, Jon Culshaw (impersonating Jeremy Clarkson and Ross Kemp) and Debra Stephenson (impersonating Davina McCall) presented thank you messages for companies who pledged large amounts of money to the appeal. These included Sainsbury's for making the largest ever corporate cheque to Comic Relief (£10 million); Ryman for selling Red Nose Day pens; Walkers for their four charity crisp flavours and BT for making it possible to answer calls to the donation line, 03457 910 910.

Sketches and features

Jack and Kevin's Comic Relief Lock In
Tonight's compilation hosted by Jack Whitehall and Kevin Bridges features clips from The Morgana Show, The One Ronnie, Miranda, The Inbetweeners, Newswipe Misery Bear and Armstrong and Miller, plus a special sketch from Peter Dickson. The audience included Marcus Akin.

Musical Performances

Music Videos

Donation progress

18 March 2011
The Desert Trek total was £1,375,037. Helen Skelton raised £253,789. Sainsbury's raised £10,030,984, the single biggest cheque that Comic Relief has received. TK Maxx raised £3,000,112. Maltesers raised £1,101,807. BT raised £353,802. Walkers raised £1,200,038. British Airways raised £800,747. Chris Moyles and Comedy Dave raised £2,600,000 for their 52 Hour Radio Marathon. Ryman raised £385,198

19 March 2011

References

Red Nose Day
2011 in British television
2011 in the United Kingdom
March 2011 events